Pilar Quintana (born 1972) is a Colombian writer. She was born in Cali and studied at the Javeriana University in Bogota. In 2011 she attended the International Writing Program of the University of Iowa as a writer-in-residence, and in 2012 the International Writers Workshop of the Baptist University of Hong Kong as a visiting writer. She has published five novels and a short story collection, Caperucita se come al lobo.  She is best known for her novels La Perra and Coleccionistas de polvos raros.

Quintana has received multiple awards for her writings.  In 2007 she was chosen by Hay Festival as one of the Bogota39, a selection of the most promising young writers in Latin America.  In 2010 she won in Spain the Premio de Novela La Mar de Letras for Coleccionistas de polvos raros. Her novel La Perra (translated from Spanish to English by Lisa Dillman and published by World Editions under the title The Bitch) was translated into 16 languages. It was shortlisted for the Colombian Premio Nacional de Novela in 2018 and the National Book Award for Translated Literature in the US in October 2020; and it was the announced winner of the English Pen Award and the Premio de Biblioteca de Narrativa Colombiana in 2018. Her screenplay Lavaperros, written with Antonio García Ángel, has won two grants by Fondo para el Desarrollo Cinematográfico, Proimágenes, and the Premio Manuel Barba of Huelva's Press Association for best script in 2020. Los abismos, her most recent work, won in 2021 the Premio Alfaguara de Novela and will be translated into several languages.

Bibliography

Novels (in Spanish)

Collections and Short Works (in Spanish)

Novels (in English)

References
3.  Global Alumni Spotlight Series: Pilar Quintana | Diversity, Equity, and Inclusion | The University of Iowa (uiowa.edu).  Retrieved Nov 8, 2021.

1972 births
Living people
Colombian women novelists
21st-century Colombian women writers
21st-century Colombian novelists
People from Cali
Pontifical Xavierian University alumni
University of Iowa alumni